Martinus Johannes Maria "Tiny" Ruys (born 8 May 1957) is a Dutch football coach who has managed SV Meerssen since 2015.

Career
Ruys was in charge of the United Arab Emirates in 2001, and has also managed Dutch club teams Fortuna Sittard and MVV Maastricht.

References

1957 births
Living people
Dutch football managers
Dutch expatriate football managers
United Arab Emirates national football team managers
Dutch expatriate sportspeople in the United Arab Emirates
Expatriate football managers in the United Arab Emirates
Fortuna Sittard managers
MVV Maastricht managers
SV Meerssen managers